Bon Chenar (also Romanized as Bon Chenār) is a village in Garakan Rural District, in the Central District of Ashtian County, Markazi Province, Iran. At the 2006 census, its population was 413, in 98 families.

References 

Populated places in Ashtian County